British firms are organised crime groups originating in the United Kingdom.

Organised crime in the United Kingdom
In analogy with the Penose in the Netherlands and the Milieu in France, organised crime in the United Kingdom has traditionally been governed by homegrown organised criminal groups involved in a multitude of illegitimate businesses. Criminal enterprises come from a variety of different ethnic backgrounds finding their origin in the UK, the most dominant of them still being the White British groups.

The whole of the UK is said to host some 7,500 different organised criminal groups that cost the country £100 million a day in crime and lost revenues.

British organised crime in other countries
In 1978, a century-old extradition treaty between the United Kingdom and Spain expired. By the time the treaty was replaced in 1985, the Costa del Sol on Spain's southern coast had become home to British expatriate criminals and fugitives, giving rise to the term "Costa del Crime". In 2006, Operation Captura, a multi-agency operation to detain criminals wanted by UK law enforcement on the run in Spain was launched. By June 2019, 96 fugitives had been listed. All but ten had been captured by February 2020. 

British, and especially Liverpudlian, drug traffickers have been operating in the Netherlands since as early as the 1980s. Following three murders in English-speaking drug circles in Amsterdam, police set up a team to investigate the scene in July 1992. The investigation revealed a network of approximately 150 predominantly English drug dealers operating in the city, trafficking cocaine, hashish and synthetic drugs sourced from Colombian and Dutch wholesalers to the UK, as well as Scandinavia, Australia and the US. In addition to the Netherlands' position as a logistical hub for drug trafficking, the country has also provided refuge for British fugitives. Reasons for this include established criminal networks, lack of language barrier and cultural similarities with the UK.

In the 1990s, British criminals and fugitives began operating in Thailand. An inexpensive country where fraudulent visas and travel documents are easily available, and police corruption is rife, Thailand provides British expatriates involved in the counterfeit goods trade a criminal endeavor relatively free from risk. British nationals have also been involved in the drug trade and money laundering in the country.

British crime firms
English and Scottish crime groups, as well as Irish gangs (like the Clerkenwell crime syndicate) and Turkish Cypriot descent (such as the Arif family) find their origin in tough, impoverished white working class neighbourhoods. They are largely family-run organised criminal gangs involved in many illegal activities in their respective areas. Even with the influx of foreign gangsters as well as with the rise of homegrown gangs consisting of minorities, white British groups are still the major concern for law enforcement and are active in the major British urban centres. Indigenous criminal organisations are mostly centred around local extended criminal families.

London crime families
London's crime families were traditionally centred in the East End of London (the infamous Kray twins being the most notable). Due to the restructuring of the East End, and the continued influx of migrants to the area, traditional Cockney families have moved to South London, parts of North London (mainly Islington), and the counties surrounding London (such as Essex and Kent). Working-class neighbourhoods are often still home to family-based crime groups involved in drug trafficking, extortion, prostitution, armed robbery, contract killing, money laundering, counterfeiting and kidnapping. Some of the more notorious South London crime families include the 'Brindles' and the 'Walkers', while the Arifs are the most notorious crime family from London's south-eastern neighbourhoods. The Hunt Crime Syndicate, otherwise known as the Canning Town Cartel, led by David Hunt is one of the biggest London crime firms. Another well-known London crime family is the Clerkenwell crime syndicate in Islington, also known as the 'Adams family'. 

London's crime families are more territorial, but can be internationally active in money laundering as well as drug trafficking, cocaine and ecstasy in particular.

Liverpudlian mafia

The Liverpudlian mafia is an informal category of drug trafficking cartels based in the city of Liverpool. In contrast to London's crime families, they are less territorial and more internationally active. The trafficking of cocaine and heroin to the British mainland as well as to countries like Spain, Portugal and the Netherlands is the main source of income for Scouse crime groups. Weapon trafficking and contract killing are activities of choice as well. Liverpudlian crime groups have forged close links with Irish criminal syndicates, as well as the Real IRA. 

The Liverpool gangs tend to be more entrepreneurial instead of territorial, where different factions will often choose to work together in several criminal activities, but will also come into conflict with each other when it comes to more localised control over organised crime. While the Liverpool mafia used to refer to the White British crime families active in the city, it has grown to include the several powerful gangs active in the Liverpudlian Black community of Toxteth. When a strategic alliance was made between several white crime families and a number of Toxteth-based gangs dubbed the Black Caucus, a number of black gangs, including one headed by Curtis Warren, grew into power and moved up from street-level crime towards the organised criminal activities the white gangs were active in.

Glasgow crime families
In analogy with London, the city of Glasgow has been home to Scottish crime families involved in drug trafficking, weapon trafficking, extortion, kidnapping, scrap dealing and murder. The syndicates of Arthur Thompson or Thomas McGraw are prime examples of Glasgow crime clans. The nature of gangs in Glasgow also has a sectarian influence imported from Ireland. Glasgow's crime families are often involved in violent feuds, as with the vendetta between the Daniel clan and the Lyons clan.

Other examples
White British crime families operate in many other cities in the United Kingdom as well, other known centres being Newcastle upon Tyne, Nottingham and Manchester. Firms outside of the more well-known London, Liverpool and Glasgow areas include the Noonans of Manchester or the Sayers in Newcastle.

Black British street gangs, such as the Tottenham Mandem and the Cheetham Hillbillies are generally not described as being part of the traditional British crime firms, which is more associated with the White British crime families from the working class districts. Black British street gangs are nevertheless an active part of the British underworld and may have connections to the White firms, the Adams crime family as an example.

Organised crime groups based in the United Kingdom (past and present)
 Clerkenwell crime syndicate
 The Hunt syndicate 
 The Kray Twins
 The Richardson Gang
 Curtis Warren Cartel
 McGraw firm
 Noonan firm
 Arif family
 Liverpudlian mafia
 Peaky Blinders
 Tottenham Mandem
 Cheetham Hillbillies
 Woolwich Boys
 The Cartel
  The Whitney Gang
  Kenneth Noye firm
  The Syndicate
 Birmingham Boys
  Charles Sabini Gang
 Elephant and Castle Mob
  The White Family
  Billy Hill Firm
  Jack “Spot” Comer’s Gang

See also 
 Gangs in the United Kingdom
 Triads in the United Kingdom
 Turkish organised crime in Great Britain

References

Organized crime by ethnic or national origin
Transnational organized crime
Organised crime groups in the Netherlands
Organised crime groups in Spain
Organised crime groups in Thailand
Organised crime groups in the United Kingdom